Ronald Cecil John Pavitt (15 September 1926 – 31 January 1988) was a British athlete. He competed in the men's high jump at the 1948 Summer Olympics and the 1952 Summer Olympics.

He also represented England in the high jump at the 1950 British Empire Games in Auckland, New Zealand.

References

1926 births
1988 deaths
Athletes (track and field) at the 1948 Summer Olympics
Athletes (track and field) at the 1952 Summer Olympics
British male high jumpers
Olympic athletes of Great Britain
Place of birth missing
Athletes (track and field) at the 1950 British Empire Games
Commonwealth Games competitors for England